Gunnar Smári Egilsson (born 11 January 1961) is an Icelandic journalist, publisher, and editor. He was one of the founders of Fréttablaðið and the weekly Eintak and Morgunpóstur as well as editing the weekly Pressan. In addition, he was one of the founders and publishers of Nyhedsavisen, which was published in Denmark on the model of Fréttablaðið, and one of the owners and editors of Fréttatíminn.

Gunnar founded Icelandic Socialist Party political party in 2017.

References

Icelandic politicians
Icelandic journalists
Icelandic publishers (people)
Icelandic editors
1961 births
Living people